Museu de la Xocolata or  Museo del Chocolate in Spanish, ("Museum of Chocolate") is a private museum in Barcelona, Catalonia, Spain, owned by the Gremio de Pastelería de Barcelona (the city pastry-makers' guild).

The museum opened in 2000, at Calle Comercio 36, in El Born, Ciudad Vieja, on the ground level of an old barrack.

Many of the displays are chocolate sculptures, including various well-known Barcelona buildings, and illustrations from various stories.

See also
List of chocolate museums

References

External links
Museu de la Xocolata website 
Museu de la Xocolata Blog 

Museums established in 2000
Museums in Barcelona
Sculpture galleries in Spain
Chocolate museums
Museu de la Xocolata
Museu de la Xocolata